Ultra-high temperature ceramic matrix composites (UHTCMC) or ultra-high Temperature Ceramic Composites (UHTCC) are a class of refractory ceramic matrix composites (CMCs), which aspires to overcome the limits associated with currently used CMCs (C/C and C/SiC) in aerospace field as thermal protection systems (TPS) and rocket nozzles. Carbon fiber reinforced carbon matrix (C/C) can be used up to 3000 °C because carbon is the element with the highest melting point however C/C are ablative materials which dissipate energy consuming themselves. Carbon fiber reinforced silicon carbide matrix composites (C/SiC) and Silicon carbide fiber reinforced silicon carbide matrix composites (SiC/SiC) are considered reusable materials because silicon carbide is a hard material with a low erosion and it forms a silica glass layer during oxidation which prevents further oxidation of inner material. Unfortunately above a certain temperature (it depends on environmental conditions of oxygen partial pressure) starts the active oxidation of silicon carbide matrix to gaseous silicon monoxide (SiO(g)), consequently loss of protection from further oxidation, which leads the material to an uncontrolled and fast erosion. For this reason C/SiC and SiC/SiC are used in the range of temperature between 1200° - 1400 °C.

On the one hand CMCs are lightweight materials with high strength-to-weight ratio even at high temperature, high thermal shock resistance and toughness but suffer of erosion during service. On the other side bulk ceramics made of ultra-high temperature ceramics (e.g. ZrB2, HfB2, or their composites) are hard materials which show low erosion even above 2000 °C but are heavy and suffer of catastrophic fracture and low thermal shock resistance compared to CMCs. Failure is easily under mechanical or thermo-mechanical loads because of cracks initiated by small defects or scratches. The possibility to obtain reusable components for aerospace field based on UHTC matrix into fiber reinforced composites is still under investigation.

The European Commission funded a research project, C3HARME, under the NMP-19-2015 call of Framework Programmes for Research and Technological Development in 2016 (still ongoing) for the design, development, production and testing of a new class of ultra-refractory ceramic matrix composites reinforced with silicon carbide fibers and Carbon fibers suitable for applications in severe aerospace environments as possible near-zero ablation thermal protection system (TPS) materials (e.g. heat shield) and for propulsion (e.g. rocket nozzle). The demand for reusable advanced materials with temperature capability over 2000 °C has been growing. Recently carbon fiber reinforced zirconium boride-based composites obtained by slurry infiltration (SI) and sintering has been investigated.

Breakthroughs in research 
The European Commission funded a research project, C3HARME, under the NMP-19-2015 call of Framework Programmes for Research and Technological Development in 2016 (still ongoing) for the design, development, production and testing of a new class of ultra-refractory ceramic matrix composites reinforced with silicon carbide fibers and Carbon fibers suitable for applications in severe aerospace environments.

References

Ceramic materials
Composite materials